Teletraffic engineering, telecommunications traffic engineering, or just traffic engineering when in context, is the application of transportation traffic engineering theory to telecommunications. Teletraffic engineers use their knowledge of statistics including queuing theory, the nature of traffic, their practical models, their measurements and simulations to make predictions and to plan telecommunication networks such as a telephone network or the Internet. These tools and knowledge help provide reliable service at lower cost.

The field was created by the work of A. K. Erlang for circuit-switched networks but is applicable to packet-switched networks, as they both exhibit Markovian properties, and can hence be modeled by e.g. a Poisson arrival process.

The crucial observation in traffic engineering is that in large systems the law of large numbers can be used to make the aggregate properties of a system over a long period of time much more predictable than the behaviour of individual parts of the system.

In PSTN architectures 

The measurement of traffic in a public switched telephone network (PSTN) allows network operators to determine and maintain the quality of service (QoS) and in particular the grade of service (GoS) that they promise their subscribers. The performance of a network depends on whether all origin-destination pairs are receiving a satisfactory service.

Networks are handled as:
loss systems, where calls that cannot be handled are given equipment busy tone, or
queuing systems, where calls that cannot be handled immediately are queued.

Congestion is defined as the situation when exchanges or circuit groups are inundated with calls and are unable to serve all the subscribers. Special attention must be given to ensure that such high loss situations do not arise. To help determine the probability of congestion occurring, operators should use the Erlang formulas or the Engset calculation.

Exchanges in the PSTN make use of trunking concepts to help minimize the cost of the equipment to the operator. Modern switches generally have full availability and do not make use of grading concepts.

Overflow systems make use of alternative routing circuit groups or paths to transfer excess traffic and thereby reduce the possibility of congestion.

A very important component in PSTNs is the SS7 network used to route signalling traffic. As a supporting network, it carries all the signalling messages necessary to set up, break down or provide extra services. The signalling enables the PSTN to control the manner in which traffic is routed from one location to another.

Transmission and switching of calls is performed using the principle of time-division multiplexing (TDM). TDM allows multiple calls to be transmitted along the same physical path, reducing the cost of infrastructure.

In call centers 

A good example of the use of teletraffic theory in practice is in the design and management of a call center. Call centers use teletraffic theory to increase the efficiency of their services and overall profitability through calculating how many operators are really needed at each time of the day.

Queueing systems used in call centers have been studied as a science. For example, completed calls are put on hold and queued until they can be served by an operator. If callers are made to wait too long, they may lose patience and default from the queue (hang up), resulting in no service being provided.

In broadband networks

Teletraffic engineering is a well-understood discipline in the traditional voice network, where traffic patterns are established, growth rates can be predicted, and vast amounts of detailed historical data are available for analysis. However, in modern broadband networks, the teletraffic engineering methodologies used for voice networks are inappropriate.

Long-tail traffic 

Of great importance is the possibility that extremely infrequent occurrences are more likely than anticipated. This situation is known as long-tail traffic. In some designs, the network might be required to withstand the unanticipated traffic.

Teletraffic economics and forecasting

As mentioned in the introduction, the purpose of teletraffic theory is to reduce cost in telecommunications networks. An important tool in achieving this goal is forecasting. Forecasting allows network operators to calculate the potential cost of a new network / service for a given QoS during the planning and design stage, thereby ensuring that costs are kept to a minimum.

An important method used in forecasting is simulation, which is described as the most common quantitative modelling technique in use today. An important reason for this is that computing power has become far more accessible, making simulation the preferred analytical method for problems that are not easily solved mathematically.

As in any business environment, network operators must charge tariffs for their services. These charges must be balanced with the supplied QoS. When operators supply services internationally, this is described as trade in services and is governed by the General Agreement on Trade in Services (GATS).

See also 

 Asynchronous Transfer Mode
 Busy hour call attempts
 Cellular traffic
 Erlang (unit)
 Flow control (disambiguation)
 Long-tail traffic
 Mobile QoS
 Routing
 RSVP-TE
 Traffic mix
 Traffic generation model
 Traffic contract
 Traffic shaping

References 

 "Deploying IP and MPLS QoS for Multiservice Networks: Theory and Practice" by John Evans, Clarence Filsfils (Morgan Kaufmann, 2007)
 V. B. Iversen, Teletraffic Engineering handbook,
 M. Zukerman, Introduction to Queueing Theory and Stochastic Teletraffic Models, PDF)

 
Queueing theory
Broadband
Telecommunications

de:Traffic Engineering
ja:通信トラヒック工学